"We Could Be Together" is the ninth single by American singer-songwriter-actress Debbie Gibson, and the fourth from the 1989 album Electric Youth. Produced by Gibson and Fred Zarr, the single was edited from its original recording. This song featured the talents of Matt Finders.  The single performed better overseas than at home, peaking at No. 22 in the United Kingdom but stalling at No. 57 in Australia and No. 71 on the Billboard Hot 100 in the United States.

Critical reception
Bryan Buss from AllMusic wrote, ""We Could Be Together", in which she basically tells her friends and family to go fly a kite, is practically anthemic in its joy at taking a risk on love: "I'll take this chance/I'll make this choice/I'll give up my security/for just the possibility/that we could be together/for a while." It's teen pop at its best: it makes you feel young, it makes you want to sing, it makes you want to fall in love."

Track listing

Chart history

Weekly charts

References

External links
 

1989 singles
1989 songs
Debbie Gibson songs
Song recordings produced by Fred Zarr
Songs written by Debbie Gibson
Atlantic Records singles